Jamal Sadat (born 2 July 1983 in Addis Abeba) is an Ethiopian football goalkeeper. He currently plays for Ethiopian Coffee.

Sadat is a member of the Ethiopia national football team. He came in winter 2003 from Nyala SC.

External links

1983 births
Living people
Ethiopian footballers
Association football goalkeepers
Ethiopia international footballers